Aechmea pimenti-velosoi is a plant species in the genus Aechmea. It is endemic to the state of Santa Catarina in southern Brazil.

Cultivars
 Aechmea 'Pie In the Sky'

References

pimenti-velosoi
Endemic flora of Brazil
Plants described in 1952